Donati is an Italian surname. Notable people with the surname include:

Angelo Donati (1885-1960), Italian banker and philanthropist
Baldassare Donati (1525/30–1603), Italian composer of the late Renaissance
Buoso Donati (—ca. 1285), character in Dante's Divine Comedy
Cianfa Donati (—bef. 1289), character in Dante's Divine Comedy
Corso Donati (–1308), leader of the Black Guelphs in Florence, brother of Forese and Piccarda
Danilo Donati (1926–2001), Italian costume designer 
Enrico Donati (1909–2008), American Surrealist painter and sculptor of Italian birth
Forese Donati (–1296), brother of Corso and Piccarda, a friend of Dante Alighieri included as a character in the Divine Comedy
Giovanni Battista Donati (1826–1873), Italian astronomer
Giulio Donati (born 1990) Italian footballer
Giuseppe Donati (1836–1925), inventor of the modern ocarina
Ignazio Donati (c. 1570–1638), Italian composer 
Massimo Donati (born 1981), Italian footballer
Matteo Donati (born 1995), Italian tennis player
Piccarda Donati (13th century), sister to Corso and Forese, included as a character in Dante's Divine Comedy
Robert Donati (1940–1991), American organized-crime figure suspected of masterminding the Isabella Stewart Gardner Museum theft
Silvano (born 1942), scientist, professor of photonics
Virgil Donati (born 1958), Australian drummer
Vitaliano Donati (1717–1762), Italian botanist

See also
 Comet Donati 
 Donati (crater) named after Giovanni Battista Donati
 Donatus of Evorea, an Albanian saint known as Shën Donati in Albanian.

Italian-language surnames